American Airlines Flight 723 was a scheduled American Airlines flight from Boston Airport in Massachusetts, to Chicago Midway Airport in Illinois.  On September 16, 1953, a Convair 240 propliner flying this route crashed while attempting to land at Albany Airport in upstate New York, killing all 28 people on board.

Accident 
The Convair had arrived at Bradley Field from Boston Airport at 6:57 am for a scheduled stopover. At that time, weather at Albany was below airline landing minima, but was forecast to improve within limits by the flight's scheduled arrival time. The flight left Bradley at 7:14, and once in the Albany terminal area, found poor visibility preventing landings, with several aircraft ahead of it in a holding pattern. The flight joined the holding pattern, circling while awaiting weather conditions legal for landing.

Two aircraft left the holding pattern, making attempts to land, but both made missed approaches. A third landed at 8:16 following an instrument approach to runway 19. After the latest airplane's successful landing, Flight 723 was cleared to execute the same instrument approach to runway 19. At 8:19, the flight advised the tower that because the aircraft's flaps could not be lowered, they would be abandoning their approach and returning to the holding pattern.

At 8:30, the Albany control tower reported: "All aircraft holding Albany. It now appears to be pretty good for a contact approach from the west. It looks much better than to the north," the north being the direction from which approaches to runway 19 had been attempted.

Flight 723 was cleared for a contact approach to runway 10. The right wing struck the center tower of the three, then the left wing struck the east tower. Seven feet of the outer panel of the right wing including the right aileron and control mechanism from the center hinge outboard together with 15 feet of the left outer wing panel and aileron separated from the aircraft.

Ground impact occurred  beyond the east tower. At this point, the aircraft had rolled to a partially inverted attitude. The nose and left wing struck the ground first. The rest of the airplane fell to earth in short order and caught fire. The aircraft narrowly missed hitting a trailer park on Albany-Schenectady Road. All 28 occupants on board (25 passengers, two pilots, and a flight attendant) were killed.

At the time of the accident, a special weather observation reported thin scattered clouds at 500 feet, with a ceiling of broken clouds estimated at 4500 feet.

Investigation 
The Civil Aeronautics Board investigated the accident and issued a report wherein they identified the probable cause of the accident: "During the execution of a contact approach, and while maneuvering for alignment with the runway to be used, descent was made to an altitude below obstructions partially obscured by fog in a local area of restricted visibility."

Samuel Bloom of Troy, NY had a reservation to be aboard this flight, however, he missed his originating flight from Albany to Boston on September 15 because of heavy traffic on the way to the airport and opted to drive to Boston instead.  The heavy traffic ultimately saved his life. This same man missed a ferry during WW2 and was forced to fly.  The ferry sank.

References

External links
 Report - Civil Aeronautics Board - PDF

Aviation accidents and incidents in the United States in 1953
1953 in New York (state)
723
Airliner accidents and incidents in New York (state)
Accidents and incidents involving the Convair CV-240 family
Transportation in Albany County, New York
Colonie, New York